Smooth jazz is a genre of commercially-oriented crossover jazz and easy listening music that became dominant in the mid-1970s to the early 1990s.

History 
Smooth jazz is a commercially oriented, crossover jazz which came to prominence in the 1980s, displacing the more venturesome jazz fusion from which it emerged. It avoids the improvisational "risk-taking" of jazz fusion, emphasizing melodic form and much of the music was initially "a combination of jazz with easy-listening pop music and lightweight R&B".

During the mid-1970s in the United States it was known as "smooth radio", and was not termed "smooth jazz" until the 1980s.

Notable artists
The mid- to late-1970s included songs “Breezin'" as performed by another smooth jazz pioneer, guitarist George Benson in 1976, the instrumental composition "Feels So Good" by flugelhorn player Chuck Mangione, in 1978, "What You Won't Do for Love" by Bobby Caldwell along with his debut album was released the same year, jazz fusion group Spyro Gyra's instrumental "Morning Dance", released in 1979 and in 1981, a collaboration between Grover Washington Jr. and Bill Withers was released as one of the most popular smooth jazz songs "Just the Two of Us".

Smooth jazz grew in popularity in the 1980s as Anita Baker, Sade, Al Jarreau, Grover Washington Jr. and Kenny G released multiple hit songs.

Critical and public reception
The smooth jazz genre experienced a backlash exemplified by critical complaints about the "bland" sound of top-selling saxophonist Kenny G, whose popularity peaked with his 1992 album Breathless.

Music reviewer George Graham argues that the "so-called 'smooth jazz' sound of people like Kenny G has none of the fire and creativity that marked the best of the fusion scene during its heyday in the 1970s".

Digby Fairweather, before the start of UK jazz station theJazz, denounced the change to a smooth jazz format on defunct radio station 102.2 Jazz FM, stating that the owners GMG Radio were responsible for the "attempted rape and (fortunately abortive) re-definition of the music — is one that no true jazz lover within the boundaries of the M25 will ever find it possible to forget or forgive."

See also
Lofi hip hop
Mallsoft
Quiet storm
Sophisti-pop
Yacht rock

References

 
Jazz fusion
Jazz genres
1970s in music
1980s in music
1990s in music
Fusion music genres